Valtesse, located at  is a quarter of the city of Bergamo in the north part of the city between the hill of Città Alta and Maresana Hill.  The population is approximately 10,000.

Overview
Valtesse was a part of the fourth circoscrizione (administrative unit of the city) and is divided into two Roman Catholic parishes: Sant'Antonio da Padova and Sant'Colombano.
Valtesse borders with the borough of Valverde, Bergamo, Conca Fiorita, Monterosso and the municipality of Ponteranica.

Quarters of Bergamo
Former municipalities of Lombardy